Gompholobium polyzygum is a species of flowering plant in the family Fabaceae and is endemic to north-western Australia. It is an erect or prostrate shrub with pinnate leaves each with sixteen to twenty-one pairs of leaflets, and yellow-orange and greenish, pea-like flowers.

Description

Taxonomy
Gompholobium polyzygum was first formally described in 1862 by Ferdinand von Mueller in Fragmenta phytographiae Australiae. The specific epithet (polyzygum) means "many-yolked", referring to the many leaflets of each leaf.

Distribution and habitat
This gompholobium grows open shrubland and grassland in arid inland areas of the Northern Territory and Western Australia.

Conservation status
Gompholobium polyzygum is classified as "not threatened" by the Western Australian Government Department of Parks and Wildlife and as of "least concern" under the Territory Parks and Wildlife Conservation Act 1976.

References

polyzygum
Eudicots of Western Australia
Flora of the Northern Territory
Plants described in 1862
Taxa named by Ferdinand von Mueller